The Philippine Senate Committee on Women, Children, Family Relations and Gender Equality is a standing committee of the Senate of the Philippines.

History 

The Senate had a Committee on Youth, Women and Family Relations until September 2, 2013, when it was split into the Committee on Youth and the Committee on Women, Family Relations and Gender Equality. The latter committee's creation also led to the addition of gender equality in the list of matters under its jurisdiction.

The committee got its current name after its jurisdiction was again expanded on August 3, 2015, to include matters relating to the welfare and protection of children.

Jurisdiction 
According to the Rules of the Senate, the committee handles all matters relating to:

 Women
 Welfare and protection of children
 Family relations
 Equality before the law of women and men

Members, 18th Congress 
Based on the Rules of the Senate, the Senate Committee on Women, Children, Family Relations and Gender Equality has 9 members.

The President Pro Tempore, the Majority Floor Leader, and the Minority Floor Leader are ex officio members.

Here are the members of the committee in the 18th Congress as of September 24, 2020:

Committee secretary: Ma. Gylissa Love J. Morales

See also 

 List of Philippine Senate committees

References 

Women
Women in the Philippines